Kenneth Madison Hayne  (born 5 June 1945) is a former Justice of the High Court of Australia, the highest court in the Australian court hierarchy.

Early life and education
Hayne was born in Gympie, Queensland and attended Scotch College, Melbourne. He graduated with a Bachelor of Arts and Bachelor of Laws (Honours) from the University of Melbourne, during which time he resided at Ormond College. Hayne was Editor of the Melbourne University Law Review. He then graduated with a Bachelor of Civil Law from Exeter College, Oxford University. He was also a Rhodes Scholar.

He is the husband of another High Court Judge, Michelle Gordon.

Career
Kenneth Hayne was admitted as a barrister and solicitor of the Supreme Court of Victoria in 1971 and was appointed as a Queen's Counsel (QC) in 1984.

Judicial activity
Kenneth Hayne joined the bench in 1992 when he was appointed as a judge of the Supreme Court of Victoria.  From 7 June 1995 he sat on the Court of Appeal of the Supreme Court of Victoria, which is the highest court in the Australian State of Victoria.

Hayne was appointed as a Justice of the High Court in September 1997. He retired in 2015 upon reaching the mandatory retirement age of 70, in accordance with Section 72 of the Australian Constitution. He was replaced on the High Court by his wife, Federal Court judge Michelle Gordon.

Hayne has been described as being a part of a 'core' of judges during his time on the High Court, usually forming the majority, and often writing joint reasons with Justice William Gummow. One notable exception was Hayne's dissent in Thomas v Mowbray, where he joined Justice Michael Kirby in holding the Commonwealth's regime of interim control orders applied in respect of suspected terrorists to be unconstitutional.  Another, more recent, example is Kuczborski v Queensland [2014] HCA 46 in which Hayne J was the sole dissenter.

Royal Commissioner
In December 2017 Hayne was appointed to head the Royal Commission into Misconduct in the Banking, Superannuation and Financial Services Industry.  The inquiry received continual media coverage and the report was delivered on 1 February 2019.

Later public life
In July 2019 (published in early August), in his first public statement since the Commission, Hayne diagnosed an increasing demand for royal commissions as a symptom that "[t]rust in all sorts of institutions, governmental and private, has been damaged or destroyed".  In his view, the public sees Australia's “opaque” decision-making processes as “skewed, if not captured” by powerful vested interests, while leaders are “unable to conduct reasoned debates about policy matters” but instead resort to the “language of war” and seek to “portray opposing views as presenting existential threats to society as we now know it”.  He noted, in particular, political reactions to the Uluru Statement from the Heart.

In August 2020, Hayne called upon all sides in politics to end "dialogue of the deaf", as in hyper-partisan conflict over climate change and over the Indigenous voice to parliament proposed in the Uluru Statement.  He hoped that the Covid-19 pandemic would encourage governmental institutions to trust the public more with the truth, so that in response the public might have greater trust in them.

Notable judgments
Al-Kateb v Godwin [2004]  indefinite detention of a stateless person
Thomas v Mowbray [2007]  concerning the validity of interim control orders
Roach v Electoral Commissioner [2007]  concerning the validity of Commonwealth legislation preventing prisoners from voting
HML v The Queen; SB v The Queen; OAE v The Queen [2008]  relevance and admissibility of evidence, as well as directions to jury.
Rowe v Electoral Commissioner [2010]  concerning the validity of Commonwealth legislation restricting the time in which a voter may seek to enrol in an election
South Australia v Totani [2010]  issue regarding the separation of powers and in particular, parliament directing the courts
Australian Electoral Commission v Johnston [2014] (sitting alone as the Court of Disputed Returns) invalidating the Western Australian Senate election from the 2013 federal election

Honours
Hayne received Australia's highest civil honour when he was appointed a Companion of the Order of Australia (AC) in 2002 for service to the judiciary, to the law as an outstanding scholar, barrister and jurist, and to the community in the advancement of both legal and general education. Hayne is a patron of the Oxford University Commonwealth Law Journal.

See also
 Judiciary of Australia
 List of Judges of the Supreme Court of Victoria

References

External links
 Hayne's biography on the High Court of Australia website
 Supreme Court of Victoria Website

1945 births
Living people
Justices of the High Court of Australia
Judges of the Supreme Court of Victoria
Alumni of Exeter College, Oxford
Companions of the Order of Australia
Melbourne Law School alumni
Australian Rhodes Scholars
Australian King's Counsel
People educated at Scotch College, Melbourne
People from Gympie